Michael Ernest Christopher Cox  (born 10 May 1939) is a former New Zealand politician of the National Party.

Biography

Cox was born in 1939 at Oxford, England. He was in the British Merchant Navy, and was a chief officer with the Union Steam Ship Company before becoming a chartered accountant in Palmerston North.

From 1981 to 1985 he was Junior Whip for the party. He was an opponent of National's then leader Robert Muldoon and was an organiser in the Colonels' Coup, an abortive attempt to remove him from the leadership of the party.

In 1984 Cox was appointed Shadow Minister of Revenue by Muldoon. In 1985 he was additionally given the Customs portfolio by new leader Jim McLay. Cox was a key supporter of McLay and became his "numbers man" in the caucus. In a major reshuffle in February 1986 McLay promoted Cox to the position of Shadow Minister of Finance. His elevation to the high profile finance portfolio role did not last long and after McLay was deposed by Jim Bolger he was relegated to the Customs portfolio once again and was additionally made Shadow Minister for the Audit Department.

In 1990, Cox was awarded the New Zealand 1990 Commemoration Medal. In the 1995 Queen's Birthday Honours, he was appointed an Officer of the Order of the British Empire, for public services.

Political positions
He has claimed that climate change is not caused by humans. He has called global warming "Complete rubbish."

Personal life
He married his former National MP colleague Katherine O'Regan in 1992.

Notes

References

1939 births
Living people
New Zealand National Party MPs
New Zealand Officers of the Order of the British Empire
New Zealand MPs for North Island electorates
People from Palmerston North
People from Oxford
English emigrants to New Zealand
Members of the New Zealand House of Representatives